On 9 June 2022, a fire caused by a suspected arson attack broke out at an office building in Daegu, South Korea, killing seven people and injuring 49 others. Among the dead was the suspected arsonist, who was reported to have started the fire in a lawyer's office.

The suspect had previously filed a complaint at a lawyer's office before the fire, and was recorded by CCTV footage carrying what looked like flammable materials. The fire broke out after he entered the office on the second floor. The flames were eventually put out in around 20 minutes by a team of 120 firefighters.

See also 
 Daegu subway fire, another act of arson in Daegu

References

2022 fires in Asia
21st-century mass murder in Asia
Arson in South Korea
Arson in the 2020s
Building and structure fires in South Korea
Office fire
June 2022 crimes in Asia
June 2022 events in South Korea
Mass murder in 2022
Mass murder in South Korea